This list of cemeteries in Hawaii includes currently operating, historical (closed for new interments), and defunct (graves abandoned or removed) cemeteries, columbaria, and mausolea which are historical and/or notable. It does not include pet cemeteries.

Hawaii (island) 
 Kuamoo Burials (also known as the Lekeleke Burial Grounds), Kuamo'o Bay, North Kona District

Maui 
 Mokuʻula cemetery, Lahaina
 Waiola Church Cemetery (also known as Waineʻe Church Cemetery), Waiola Church, Lahaina

Oahu 

 Honolulu Catholic Cemetery, Honolulu
 Kyoto Gardens of Honolulu Memorial Park, Honolulu
 Lunalilo Mausoleum, Honolulu
 National Memorial Cemetery of the Pacific, Honolulu
 Oahu Cemetery (also known as Nuʻuanu Cemetery), Honolulu
 Royal Mausoleum (Mauna ʻAla), Honolulu
 USS Arizona Memorial, Pearl Harbor, 
 Valley of the Temples Memorial Park, near Kāneʻohe

See also
 List of cemeteries in the United States

References

External links
 

Hawaii